The 1978 NCAA Division I men's ice hockey tournament was the culmination of the 1977–78 NCAA Division I men's ice hockey season, the 31st such tournament in NCAA history. It was held between March 18 and 25, 1978, and concluded with Boston University defeating Boston College 5-3. The first round games were held at the home team venue while all succeeding games were played at the Providence Civic Center in Providence, Rhode Island.

Qualifying teams
The NCAA gave four teams automatic bids into the tournament. The two ECAC teams that reached the ECAC tournament final received bids as did the two WCHA co-champions. The NCAA also had the ability to add up to 4 additional teams as it saw fit and chose to include the CCHA tournament champion as well as Boston University who had lost only two games prior to the tournament (the second being in the ECAC semifinal). This was the only time in the four years this format was used that an additional team was added to the tournament. Because Colorado College entered the tournament with a losing record Bowling Green was given the honor of hosting the western first round game.

Format
The four automatic qualifiers were seeded according to pre-tournament finish. The ECAC champion was seeded as the top eastern team while the WCHA co-champion that finished highest in the regular season was given the top western seed. The second eastern seed was slotted to play the top western seed and vice versa. Because an at-large bid was offered to a western school they were placed in a first round game with the second western seed to determine the final semifinalist. The first round game was played at the home venue of the second seed while all succeeding games were played at the Providence Civic Center. All matches were Single-game eliminations with the semifinal winners advancing to the national championship game and the losers playing in a consolation game.

Tournament Bracket

Note: * denotes overtime period(s)

First round

(A1) Bowling Green vs. (W2) Colorado College

(E2) Providence vs. (A2) Boston University

Semifinal

(W1) Wisconsin vs. (A2) Boston University

(E1) Boston College vs. (A1) Bowling Green

Third Place Game

(W1) Wisconsin vs. (A1) Bowling Green

National Championship

(E1) Boston College vs. (A2) Boston University

All-Tournament Team
G: Paul Skidmore (Boston College)
D: Dick Lamby (Boston University)
D: Jack O'Callahan* (Boston University)
F: Mark Fidler (Boston University)
F: Joe Mullen (Boston College)
F: Dave Silk (Boston University)
* Most Outstanding Player(s)

References

Tournament
NCAA Division I men's ice hockey tournament
NCAA Division I Men's Ice Hockey Tournament
NCAA Division I Men's Ice Hockey Tournament
NCAA Division I Men's Ice Hockey Tournament
Ice hockey competitions in Providence, Rhode Island
Ice hockey competitions in Ohio
Bowling Green, Ohio